Women in French Guiana are women living in or are from French Guiana. Some of these women are from the Maroon society of French Guiana. Although matrilineal in nature, some Maroon women in French Guiana once acted only as assistants or basia to the kabiten or male leader. A common job for the Maroon women in French Guiana include cleaning work in coastal areas, particularly in the markets of Saint-Laurent and Cayenne to earn income that would support their children.

Other women from French Guiana also come from other ethnic groups such as the Kali'na, the Oyaricoulet, and the Wayana peoples.

References

External links